Dániel Németh (born 9 October 2003) is a Hungarian professional footballer who plays for Zalaegerszeg.

Career statistics
.

References

2003 births
People from Gyöngyös
Sportspeople from Heves County
Living people
Hungarian footballers
Hungary youth international footballers
Hungary under-21 international footballers
Association football forwards
Budapest Honvéd FC players
NK Nafta Lendava players
Zalaegerszegi TE players
Nemzeti Bajnokság I players
Slovenian Second League players
Hungarian expatriate footballers
Expatriate footballers in Slovenia
Hungarian expatriate sportspeople in Slovenia